Persoonia comata is a species of flowering plant in the family Proteaceae and is endemic to the south-west of Western Australia.

Description
The anthers are bright yellow with white tips.

Taxonomy
Persoonia comata was first formally described in 1855 by Carl Meissner in Hooker's Journal of Botany and Kew Garden Miscellany.

Distribution and habitat
This geebung grows in Eucalyptus and Banksia forest and woodland or heath, in near-coastal areas between Mount Peron near Jurien Bay and Yanchep in the Avon Wheatbelt, Geraldton Sandplains and Swan Coastal Plain biogeographic regions.

Conservation status
Persoonia comata is classified as "not threatened" by the Western Australian Government Department of Parks and Wildlife.

References

comata
Flora of Western Australia
Plants described in 1855
Taxa named by Carl Meissner